Ido Aharoni Aronoff (born 1962) is an Israeli career diplomat, advisor to international companies, public speaker and university lecturer, writer and investor. He was born in Jaffa (Tel Aviv-Yaffo), Israel. Aharoni spent his entire diplomatic career in the United States. He is a 25-year veteran of Israel’s Foreign service . He is a public diplomacy specialist, founder of the Brand Israel Program, and a well-known place positioning practitioner . Aharoni has served as a Member of the Board Governors of Tel Aviv University’s and its cabinet since 2015  and as a lecturer at the university’s Coller School of Management since 2018  and is the host of TAU Unbound, the official English language podcast of Tel Aviv University . Aharoni is the co-founder and Global Ambassador for the Genius 100 Visions community and serves as a consultant to international companies such as MasterCard  APCO Worldwide  The Libra Group , Bank Leumi USA and Value Base  He is a co-founder of Israel-based consultancy Emerson Rigby Ltd.  British-Israeli investment company EA2K .

Early Life 
Ido Aharoni Aronoff was born in Tel Aviv in 1962 and raised in Holoon. His mother, Ahuva Aharoni (ne’e Madar), was a kindergarten teacher  She was born in Tel Aviv in 1932. Her Parents came from Yemen in 1912 and settled in the Yemenite section of Tel Aviv known as Kerem HaTeimanim, and later moved to Hatikva neighborhood of Tel Aviv where Aharoni spent significant time with his grandparents. 

His father Emanuel Aharoni Aronoff   was a scholar, author, expert on the country’s geography, lecturer and one of the early environmentalists in Israel  He was of Bukharan family and was born in Mersin, Turkey in 1926 to Rabbi Avraham Aronoff and his wife Hanna Aronoff (ne’e Yohananoff). Aharoni’s great-grandfather, Rabbi Emanuel Aronoff, settled in Jerusalem in 1874 and was one of the founders of the Bukharan Quarter. He was known as the “first Bukharan to move to Jerusalem by foot”. Aharoni’s father was a member of the Haganah and participated in the 1948 War of Independence where he was injured twice in battle . In 2001 he was given the Honorary Citizen Award by the City of Holon 

Aharoni attended H.N. Bialik Elementary School and H. Kugel High School, both in Holon.

Education 
Aharoni obtained a Bachelor of Arts degree from Tel Aviv University with a joint-major in Film and Television, Sociology and Anthropology.  In 1990, he earned a master's degree in Mass Communications from Emerson College in Boston. In 1993 Aharoni attended the Hebrew University special program for foreign service cadets in Government and Diplomacy.

Career 
Aharoni served in the Israel Defense Forces as an infantry company commander during the first Lebanon War. As policy assistant to Israel's chief negotiator, in 1993–94 he participated in the negotiations leading to the Declaration of Principles between Israel and the PLO which led to the signing of the Gaza–Jericho Agreement. In senior roles as a diplomat he held three overseas positions (all in the USA) once in Los Angeles and twice in New York. As Israel's Consul in NYC (2001–2005), Aharoni  played a significant role in promoting friendship between the city and his country. In 2010 he retired from the IDF Military Reserves at the age of 48, as Major. He was a member of Israel's Foreign Service  from 1991 to 2016.

Since September 2016 he has been a Global Distinguished Professor of International Relations at New York University's  in the Faculty of Arts and Sciences. His academic publications are listed on Google scholar 

Aharoni is an active public speaker, having delivered numerous lectures on the Middle East affairs, nation branding and other public matters at institutions in Israel and the US, including Carnegie Mellon University (2007), the Interdisciplinary Center Herzliya (2010), Barnard College (2012),  Emerson College (2012), San Diego State University (2012),  Colgate University (2013),  Duke University’s Fuqua School of Business (2013), Haas School of Business at UC Berkeley (2013), Boston University (2014), University of Haifa (2014), University of Tulsa (2014), Wharton Business School (2015), Yale School of Management (2015), Johnson School of Management at Cornell University (2016), Columbia Law School (2016), Florida Atlantic University (2018), Stony Brook University (2019), and many others.

Aharoni has frequently been an invited analyst and article author in US and Israeli news media and newspapers, mainly covering Israel's international affairs and nation branding.  In 2013, he was invited by Google to take part in their speakers’ series Talks at Google. He has been a public advocate to the branding of Israel by increasing the visibility of its better perceived traits (diversity, democracy, agriculture, science, high technology, history and culture) rather than by the more demanding attempting to improve the public's understanding and complexity of its international conflicts and related policies.

Since 2015, he has been member of the Board of Governors (and the global campaign cabinet) at Tel Aviv University. He was a facilitator to a ten million dollar gift by Hollywood producer and NFL owner Steve Tish to Tel Aviv University's Department of Film and Television.

In 2016 Aharoni became Global Ambassador of Maccabi World Union, a Jewish sporting organization. In 2017 Aharoni became Ambassador for the Genius 100 Vision Foundation, which he helped establish in the spirit of Albert Einstein. In 2018 Aharoni became the Chairman of the Charney Forum for New Diplomacy, the forum is academically affiliated with the University of Haifa and focused on training the new generations on advanced practices of diplomacy. In 2021 Aharoni became Chairman of GMFF, an Israeli film and TV fund dedicated to multiculturalism.[X] He is also a member of the advisory bodies of companies APCO Worldwide, and Value Base.

Published interviews to Aharoni on his subjects of expertise can be readily found online.

Honors 
In 1998, Aharoni was given the Community Leadership Award in Los Angeles by the American Friends of the Rabin Medical Center.  In 2005, a communications studies scholarship, ‘Wings of Hope,’ was named after him by the Yemenite-Jewish Federation of North America. In 2013, Algemeiner Journal named him among the ‘Top 100 People Positively Influencing Jewish Life,’ commonly known as the Jewish 100. In 2015 he was designated Honorary Governor by Tel Aviv University. In 2016, New York City Mayor Bill de Blasio announced July 29, 2016, as “Ambassador Ido Aharoni Day” in New York while expressing: I don't know anyone who's done more to bond New York City and Israel, and the people of the United States and Israel. In 2019, he was selected by Hello Israel TV as one of the “Global Jewish 100”, recognizing his contributions as an Israeli diplomat.

References

External links 
 Ido Aharoni's website

Living people
1962 births
People from Jaffa
Israeli consuls
Israeli diplomats
Israeli businesspeople
New York University faculty
Tel Aviv University alumni
Emerson College alumni